Al Liguori (June 3, 1885 - May 8, 1951) was an Italian born cinematographer mainly of the silent era. His style of photography was a precursor to what became known as film noir. His best known surviving film is the all-black Scar of Shame (1927). He came to America as a child and his family settled in Brooklyn New York where he was educated. He was born in Salerno Italy and died in Pennsylvania in 1951.

Selected filmography
The Innocent Lie (1916)
The Smugglers (1916)
Marie, Ltd. (1919)
Redhead (1919)
The Teeth of the Tiger (1919)  
The World and His Wife (1920)
The Passionate Pilgrim (1921)
Straight Is the Way (1921)
The Woman God Changed (1921)
Boomerang Bill (1922)
Timothy's Quest (1922)
Salome of the Tenements (1925)
The Scar of Shame (1927)

References

External links

 Cinema News April 1, 1917; "Art and the Movies" by Lewis W. Physioc
 pic

1885 births
1951 deaths
Italian cinematographers
People from Salerno
American people of Italian descent